Vicente Joaquín Osorio de Moscoso y Guzmán, 11th Count of Altamira, GE (10 January 1756 – 26 August 1816), was a Spanish peer, politician and diplomat who served as Consejero de Estado and president of the Junta Central during the reign of Charles IV. He was also ambassador in Vienna and Turin.

Biography

Vicente Joaquín was born in Madrid the 10 January 1756, son of Ventura Osorio de Moscoso y Fernández de Córdoba, who was the 10th Count of Altamira. His mother was María de la Concepción de Guzmán y de la Cerda, daughter of the Marquesses of Montealegre and Aguilar de Campoo.

Familiarly linked to the court of the Kingdom of Spain, his family had held important positions; being his grandfather, his great-grandfather and his great-great-grandfather Sumiller de Corps of different kings.

He married on 3 April 1774, with María Ignacia Álvarez de Toledo y Gonzaga, daughter of Antonio Álvarez de Toledo y Osorio, 10th Marquess of Villafranca del Bierzo and two years later, his father died, thus inheriting his immense fortune. His mother also died in the same year as his father.

Charles III appointed him, shortly after, governor of the Banco de San Carlos, the main bank in the country at the time.

He also finished the works on his Palacio de Altamira in Madrid, begun by his father and designed by Ventura Rodríguez.

Widowed in 1798, Charles IV chose him in 1801 as his main caballerizo mayor.

On 11 December 1806 he married for a second time, with María Magdalena Fernández de Córdoba y Ponce de León. After the Motín de Aranjuez, the new king Ferdinand VII confirmed him in his post, although for a short time, since months later, he fled to Bayonne.

During the War of Independence he belonged to the Junta Suprema Central and became its president (1808-1809).

He died in Madrid the 26 August 1816.

Titles held

Dukedoms 

 15th Duke of Maqueda (GE)
 11th Duke of Baena (GE)
 13th Duke of Sessa (GE)
 12th Duke of Soma (GE)
 9th Duke of Sanlúcar la Mayor (GE)
 7th Duke of Medina de las Torres (GE)
 6th Duke of Atrisco (GE)
 12th Duke of Terranova (GE) - held unofficially due to extinction
 12th Duke of Santángelo (GE) - held unofficially due to extinction
 12th Duke of Andría (GE) - held unofficially due to extinction

Marquessates 

16th Marquess of Astorga (GE)
7th Marquess of Castromonte (GE)
7th Marquess of Leganés (GE)
10th Marquess of Velada (GE)
10th Marquess of Almazán
11th Marquess of Poza
7th Marquess of Mairena
6th Marquess of Morata de la Vega
7th Marquess of Monasterio
13th Marquess of Ayamonte
8th Marquess of Villamanrique
8th Marquess of Villa de San Román
15th Marquess of Elche
10th Marquess of Montemayor
9th Marquess of Águila

Countships 

11th Count of Altamira (GE)
12th Count of Cabra (GE)
17th Count of Palamós
13th Count of Trivento
13th Countof Avellino
12th Count of Oliveto
15th Count of Monteagudo de Mendoza
10th Count of Losada
8th Count of Arzacóllar
12th Count of Trastámara
15th Count of Santa María de Ortigueira
10th Count of Lodosa
9th Count of Saltés
18th Count of Nieva
4th Count of Garcíez
3rd Count of Valhermoso
? Count of Cantillana

Viscountcies 
12th Viscount of Iznájar

Baronies 
22nd Baron of Bellpuig
13th Baron of Calonge
14th Baron Liñola

See also

List of dukes in the peerage of Spain
List of current Grandees of Spain

References

1756 births
1816 deaths